Söllichau is a village and a former municipality in Wittenberg district in Saxony-Anhalt, Germany. Since 1 July 2009, it is part of the town Bad Schmiedeberg. It is situated between the small towns of Bad Düben and Bad Schmiedeberg, in the middle of the Düben Heath. The former municipality had one constituent centre, die Gleinermühle.

History 
Söllichau had its first documentary mention in 1346. The area had, however, been inhabited much earlier by Germanic tribes, and by the sixth century, by Slavs. Hence comes the name Söllichau, which has its roots in the Slavic name "Zelichow" ("Lord Zelich's Place"). After being conquered by the German kings, the area was settled by Flemish farmers. Until 1815, Söllichau belonged to Saxony and was jurisdictionally and for taxation purposes subordinate to the Amt of Düben and thereby also to the Leipzig district. As a result of the Congress of Vienna, Söllichau, together with the whole Amt passed to the Kingdom, and after 1918, the State of Prussia. After 1952, when East Germany abolished the Land system, Söllichau, along with its neighbours Tornau and Schwemsal were taken out of the Amt. Söllichau ended up in the Halle region, and more locally in the Gräfenhainichen district. After German Reunification in 1990, Söllichau stayed for the time being in Gräfenhainichen district, but the district itself was later made part of Wittenberg district.

Geography and transportation 
Söllichau's neighbouring towns are Bad Düben, Bad Schmiedeberg, Wittenberg, Kemberg, Pretzsch and Torgau. Söllichau lies on the abandoned railway line between Eilenburg and Pretzsch. Söllichau is a transport hub for two State Highways (Landesstraßen) and two district roads (Kreisstraßen) of great importance to local traffic.

Politics
(Municipal election on 13 June 2004)

 Reinhard Domtera
 Kay Eckelmann
 Bernd Hoffmann
 Marko Höhne
 Thomas Kaiser
 Sylvia Kästner
 Björn Kieselstein
 Dirk Koch
 Christa König
 Holger Kriener
 Hannelore Purschwitz
 Otto Trebeljahr

Source: Statistisches Landesamt Sachsen-Anhalt

Neighbouring municipalities
Bad Schmiedeberg
Korgau
Tornau (Dübener Heide)
Bad Düben

Sightseeing
Neo-Romanesque village church
Former NVA command bunker
Bronze Age cairns, on district road 2029 Söllichau - Korgau - Pretzsch
Röhrenkästenbrunnen
Old village blacksmith's shop
Mineral spring, seven-arm columns

External links
 Private site about Söllichau
 Dübener Heide

Former municipalities in Saxony-Anhalt
Bad Schmiedeberg